Major General Robert Tryon Frederick (March 14, 1907 – November 29, 1970) was a senior United States Army officer who fought in World War II. During the war, he commanded the 1st Special Service Force, the 1st Allied Airborne Task Force, and the 45th Infantry Division. He was twice awarded the Distinguished Service Cross and several other decorations.

Biography

Early life and military career
Frederick was born on March 14, 1907, in San Francisco, California. He attended Staunton Military Academy from 1923 to 1924 and the United States Military Academy (USMA) at West Point from 1924 to 1928. Upon graduation from West Point, New York, he was commissioned as a second lieutenant in the Coast Artillery Corps of the United States Army. He graduated from the U.S. Army Command and General Staff College at Fort Leavenworth, Kansas, in 1939.

World War II
In 1942, after the United States entered World War II due to the Japanese attack on Pearl Harbor, after serving as a staff officer in the War Department, then a lieutenant colonel, Frederick was tasked with raising a new U.S.-Canadian regiment size commando force which became the 1st Special Service Force (later called the "Devil's Brigade" by the Germans). The unit, activated on July 9, 1942, at Fort William Henry Harrison, Montana, was originally intended for commando operations in Norway, and trained extensively in winter and mountain warfare, as well as hand-to-hand combat and other infantry skills. In April 1943, the unit moved to Vermont for training, first at Camp Bradford and then at Fort Ethan Allen. The Norway mission was cancelled, however, and the 1st Special Service Force was sent instead to the Aleutian Islands in July 1943. It returned to the contiguous United States in September, and then left in October for the European Theater of Operations (ETO).

Frederick's men arrived in Casablanca in French Morocco in November 1943 and quickly moved to the Italian front. Landing at Naples on November 19, 1943, the 1st Special Service Force went into the line. In December 1943 and January 1944, the 1st Special Service Force conducted a series of operations at Monte la Difensa, Monte la Remetanea, Monte Sammucro (Hill 720) and Monte Vischiataro. The 1st Special Service Force attacked and captured the enemy forces at the impregnable Monte la Difensa.

On February 2, 1944, Frederick, now a full colonel, and his men landed at Anzio and went into action along the Mussolini Canal. They were the first Allied troops to enter the Italian capital of Rome on June 4, 1944. Frederick was decorated twice with the Distinguished Service Cross, the U.S. Army's second highest award for valor in combat. The first award was for actions on January 10–13, 1944 and the second award for actions on June 4, 1944. While at Anzio he was wounded a number of times, including two separate wounds on a single day.

On June 23, 1944, Frederick announced he was leaving the unit. He was promoted to the one-star general officer rank of brigadier general in July, and was given command of the 1st Allied Airborne Task Force, an ad hoc division-sized airborne formation, for the Allied invasion of Southern France; he was the youngest general to command a division-size unit in World War II. The task force consisted of the British 2nd Independent Parachute Brigade and the American 509th and 551st Parachute Infantry Battalions, the 517th Parachute Regimental Combat Team, the 550th Glider Infantry Battalion, and the 460th and 463rd Parachute Field Artillery Battalions, along with various support units.

On August 15, under the code name Rugby Force, the unit jumped into the Argens Valley between Le Luc and Le Muy, behind the Massif des Maures, a key piece of terrain which overlooked the Allied landing beaches near St. Tropez and St. Raphaël. Having successfully blocked German forces from reaching the invasion beaches, the 1st Airborne Task Force linked up with the U.S. 36th Infantry Division on August 17, 1944. It then moved up the French Riviera coastline, taking Cannes unopposed on August 24, 1944, and linking up with Frederick's old unit, the 1st Special Service Force. The 1st Special Service Force had initially been tasked to seize several small islands off the French Riviera and then moved onshore, where it was attached to the 1st Airborne Task Force on August 22 (replacing the British 2nd Independent Parachute Brigade). The task force then fought on to the French-Italian border, where it took up defensive positions. The task force was dissolved on November 23, 1944 (and the 1st Special Service Force was disbanded on December 5).

Frederick was, at the age of just 37, promoted to the two-star rank of major general and given command of the 45th Infantry Division on December 3, 1944. Along with Major General James M. Gavin, then commanding the 82nd Airborne Division, this made both Frederick and Gavin (eight days younger than Frederick) the two youngest division commanders in the U.S. Army during the war. He led the 45th Division until September 10, 1945. The 45th saw heavy combat in French Alsace from December 1944 through to February 1945, and was pulled from the line to rehabilitate on February 17. In mid-March, it was assigned to XV Corps for Operation Undertone, the final drive into Germany.

The division crossed the Rhine and advanced to the Main.  Moving along the Main into Bavaria, participating in heavy fighting in Aschaffenburg from March 28 to April 3 and then drove to Nuremberg, taken in heavy fighting from April 16–20. Moving south, the division crossed the Danube on April 26, and opened up the path for the U.S. 20th Armored Division to drive on Munich. Reaching Munich on April 29, the division shifted from combat to occupation.

The British Prime Minister, Sir Winston Churchill, declared that Robert Frederick was "the greatest fighting general of all time" and "if we had had a dozen more like him we would have smashed Hitler in 1942".

Post-World War II
After a period of occupation duty, the 45th Infantry Division prepared to return to the United States and Frederick relinquished command in September 1945. From 1 November 1945 to 19 August 1947 he was commandant of the Coast Artillery School, and presided over its move from Fort Monroe to Fort Winfield Scott. After a period of staff duty and recuperation (he had been wounded eight times), Major General Frederick was assigned to Allied occupation forces in Austria, commanding the U.S. Sector, of the Vienna Inter-Allied Command in 1948. From February 28, 1949, to October 10, 1950, he commanded the 4th Infantry Division, which had been reactivated as a training division at Fort Ord, California, in 1947. In October 1950, the division was redesignated the  6th Infantry Division, and Frederick continued as its commanding general until 1951.

In 1951, Frederick returned to Europe to take command of the Joint U.S. Military Aid Group, Greece (JUSMAG Greece).  He retired on disability in March 1952. In the 1968 film The Devil's Brigade, which chronicled the formation, training and combat in Italy of the 1st Special Service Force, Robert T. Frederick was played by actor William Holden. Frederick  died on November 29, 1970, in Stanford, California.

V-42 combat knife
The V-42 combat knife was designed in part by Frederick when commanding officer of the 1st Special Service Force. The V-42 was the trademark weapon of the 1st Special Service Force, and its members were trained extensively in its use. It is a short-bladed stiletto with a thumb groove on the top of the blade to promote proper hand placement when attacking an opponent. It is often confused with the longer- and thicker-bladed Fairbairn–Sykes fighting knife. The profile of the V-42 knife appears in the crests of the U.S. Army Special Forces and Canada's Joint Task Force Two.

Military awards
Frederick's military decorations and awards include:

Distinguished Service Cross Citation (1st Award)
Rank: Brigadier General (then colonel)
Unit: 1st Special Service Force
Awarded on: 1944
Action: January 10 to 13, 1944
General Orders: Headquarters, Fifth U.S. Army, General Orders No. 102 (1944)

Distinguished Service Cross Citation (2nd Award)

Rank: Major General (then Brig. General)
Unit: 1st Special Service Force
Awarded on: 1944
Action: June 4, 1944
General Orders: Headquarters, Fifth U.S. Army, General Orders No. 102 (1944)

See also
James M. Gavin
Tommy Prince

References

Bibliography

Burhans, Robert D., The First Special Service Force: A Canadian/American Wartime Alliance: The Devil's Brigade (Washington: Infantry Journal Press Inc. 1947)
Cottingham, Peter Layton Once Upon a Wartime: A Canadian Who Survived the Devil's Brigade (P.L. Cottingham, Manitoba Canada, 1996)

Hicks, Anne. "The Last Fighting General: The Biography of Robert Tryon Frederick" (Schiffer Pub Ltd, 2006) .
Ross, Robert Todd, The Supercommandos First Special Service Force, 1942-1942, An Illustrated History (Atglen, PA: Schiffer Publishing Ltd. 2000).
Springer, Joseph, The Black Devil Brigade: The True Story of the First Special Service Force, (Pacifica Military History, 2001).
Werner, Brett. "First Special Service Force 1942 - 44" (Osprey Publishing, 2006) .
Wickham, Kenneth. "An Adjutant General Remembers" (Adjutant General's Corps Regimental Association, 1991).
Wood, James. "'Matters Canadian' and the Problem with Being Special: Robert T. Frederick on the First Special Service Force." Canadian Military History 12, no. 4 (Autumn 2003): 17-33.
Wood, James A. We Move Only Forward: Canada, the United States, and the First Special Service Force, 1942-1944 (St. Catharines, ON: Vanwell Publishing, 2006).
Generals of World War II

|-

|-

Staunton Military Academy alumni
United States Military Academy alumni
Recipients of the Distinguished Service Cross (United States)
Recipients of the Distinguished Service Medal (US Army)
Recipients of the Silver Star
Recipients of the Legion of Merit
Companions of the Distinguished Service Order
Recipients of the Croix de Guerre 1939–1945 (France)
Recipients of the Air Medal
United States Army Command and General Staff College alumni
Officiers of the Légion d'honneur
Grand Officers of the Order of Saint-Charles
Recipients of the King Haakon VII Freedom Medal
1907 births
1970 deaths
United States Army Coast Artillery Corps personnel
Military personnel from California
United States Army generals of World War II
United States Army generals